Ganiol Kaçuli (born 22 September 1989 in Elbasan) is an Albanian professional footballer who most recently played for KF Elbasani in the Albanian Superliga.

Honours
KF Elbasani
Albanian First Division (1): 2013-14

References

1989 births
Living people
Footballers from Elbasan
Albanian footballers
Association football defenders
KF Elbasani players
Kategoria Superiore players
Kategoria e Parë players